This is a list of law schools in New Zealand.

 School of Law, Auckland University of Technology
 Faculty of Law, University of Auckland
 Faculty of Law, University of Waikato, Hamilton
 Faculty of Law, Victoria University of Wellington
 School of Law, University of Canterbury, Christchurch
 Faculty of Law, University of Otago, Dunedin

New Zealand